WEIU-TV, virtual channel 51 (UHF digital channel 30), is a Public Broadcasting Service (PBS) member television station licensed to Charleston, Illinois, United States. Owned by Eastern Illinois University (EIU), it is a sister station to campus radio station WEIU (88.9 FM). The two stations share studios on the EIU campus in Charleston; WEIU-TV's transmitter is located near Humboldt, Illinois.

WEIU-TV is a member of PBS' Program Differentiation Plan (PDP), previously known as the "Beta Group". As a secondary PBS member station for the Champaign–Springfield–Decatur market, it airs 25% of the PBS network schedule.

Broadcast area
WEIU-TV's broadcast radius extends south to Effingham, north to Champaign, west to Decatur, and east to Terre Haute, Indiana.

The station serves Champaign, Christian, Clark, Coles, Crawford, Cumberland, Douglas, Edgar, Effingham, Jasper, Macon, Moultrie, Piatt, Sangamon, Shelby, and Vermilion counties in Illinois and Vigo County in Indiana.

History
WEIU-TV began operations on July 1, 1986, as an independent non-commercial station offering public affairs and instructional programming, as well as the student-run news program News Scan. On January 30, 1992, WEIU-TV officially joined PBS. In January 2002, the newscast was renamed News Watch; it currently airs from 5:30 p.m. to 6:00 p.m. News Watch won its first Emmy Award in 2009 and its second Emmy in 2010.

WEIU-TV launched its first digital broadcast in 2006, on UHF channel 50 (tuned as virtual channel 51). The station began broadcasting in high definition (HD) on March 22, 2010. It offered the first local HD newscast for viewers in central Illinois. Before June 2010, no commercial television stations in the market were producing news in HD, which changed when NBC affiliate WAND became the first to make the switch.

Digital television

Digital channels
The station's digital signal is multiplexed:

Analog-to-digital conversion
On February 17, 2009, WEIU-TV shut down its analog signal over UHF channel 51. This was the original target date on which full-power television stations in the United States were federally mandated to transition from analog to digital broadcasts. The station's digital signal remained on its pre-transition UHF channel 50. Through the use of PSIP, digital television receivers continued to display the station's virtual channel as its former UHF analog channel 51.

Related channels
In addition to its main station, WEIU-TV also operates "Your 13", a cable TV channel offered to Consolidated Communications subscribers that presents educational, sports, informational and local public access programming, as well as an overnight simulcast of WEIU-FM. Unlike WEIU-TV, some of the programs on "Your 13" are funded by commercials.

WEIU-TV also broadcasts a variety of international programming on its second digital sub-channel.

References

External links
Official website
Your 13
Hit Mix 88.9
The Odyssey
Southern Media's News Music Search Archive page of WEIU News themes

PBS member stations
Television channels and stations established in 1986
1986 establishments in Illinois
EIU-TV
Charleston, Illinois
First Nations Experience affiliates